Hubert Allen may refer to:

Hubert Allen, manager of Yelloway Motor Services
Morgantina#Hubert Allen and the University of Illinois
Hubert Allison Allen (1872–1942), American general
Hubert Raymond Allen (1919–1987), Royal Air Force officer

See also
Bert Allen (disambiguation)